Anodonthyla rouxae is a species of frogs in the family Microhylidae. It is endemic to Madagascar. Its natural habitat is subtropical or tropical moist montane forests. It is threatened by habitat loss.

References

Anodonthyla
Amphibians described in 1974
Endemic frogs of Madagascar
Taxa named by Jean Marius René Guibé
Taxonomy articles created by Polbot